Day of the Dog is the second album by Australian hip hop group Bliss n Eso. It was released via Illusive Sounds in March 2006 in both vinyl and CD formats.  The title is a metaphor for Australian hip hop being the 'underdog' of the Australian music industry, and affirming that it is now time for it to rise up. It reached the top 50 on the ARIA Albums Chart.

Reception 

Day of the Dog peaked at No. 45 on the ARIA Albums Chart in March 2006.

Track listing

Personnel

 MC Bliss 
 BNAproductions 
 DJ Hoppa 
 M-Phazes – production 
 Motley 
 N.U.G. 
 Rocc 
 SeFu 
 Suffa 
 Trax 
 Trillion 
 Weapon X 
 Wika

Charts

References

2006 albums
Bliss n Eso albums